Alok Pratap Singh (born 26 October 1993) is an Indian cricketer. He plays Twenty20 cricket for Bengal. He made his List A debut for Bengal in the 2017–18 Vijay Hazare Trophy on 13 February 2018.

See also
 List of Bengal cricketers

References

External links
 

1993 births
Living people
Indian cricketers
Bengal cricketers